Nadia Naked is the debut album by South African rapper Nadia Nakai. The album was released on June 2, 2019, by Family Tree Records. It features guest appearances by Cassper Nyovest, Khuli Chana, Kwesta, Lady Zamar, Tshego and Stefflon Don.

Background
In 2016, Nakai released her first EP, titled Bragga, and signed a new record deal with Family Tree Records.  Three years later, she explained that she wanted to create a personal album rather than repeating her earlier party songs.

Artwork and title
The artwork used for the album was shot by Jiten Ramlal and designed by Jabu Nkosi. The album cover features Nakai nude. On May 3, 2019, Nakai revealed the title and the release date of the album on Twitter. Nakai has said that the title combines her name and the idea that her performances are so emotionally revealing that she seems "naked".

Critical reception
Michael Highly of Dope Off The Press observed that Nakai "feels seasoned and much more confident throughout the album".

Accolades 

! 
|-
|2019
| Nadia Naked
| Album of the Year in Africa
| 
|

Track listing

Personnel
Credits adapted from Allmusic website.

Personnel
Nadia Kandava – lead vocals, composer
Stefflon Don – composer, lead vocals (track 17)
Cassper Nyovest – composer, lead Vocals (track 7,10)
Khuli Chana – composer, lead vocals (track 8)
Kwesta – composer, lead vocals (track 15)
Lady Zamar – vocals (track 9)
Y. Cee – lead vocals (track 16)
Sio – lead vocals (track 15)
Tshego – lead vocals (track 11)
Oludemilade Martin Alej – composer
Yamikani Banda – composer
Bash Jameson – composer
Benn Gilbert Kamoto – composer
Tshegofatso Ketshbile – composer
Almotie Mtombeni – composer
Tawanda Mujaji – composer
Senzo Vilakazi – composer
Ntuthuko Zungu – composer

Release history

References

2019 debut albums